Ledezma is a Spanish-language surname. People with the surname include:

People 
 Antonio Ledezma (born 1955), Venezuelan lawyer, politician and former political prisoner
 Froylán Ledezma (born 1978), Costa Rican football forward
 Iván Ledezma (born 1995), Chilean footballer
 Jorge Ledezma (born 1963), Bolivian lawyer and politician
 Juan Pablo Ledezma (born 1987), Mexican gangleader of La Línea
 Nicolás Ledezma, Mexican paralympic athlete
 Richard Ledezma (born 2000), American soccer player
 Wil Ledezma (born 1981), Venezuelan professional baseball pitcher
 Luis Henríquez Ledezma (born 1981; Luis Henríquez), Panamanian football defender
 Leonel Moreira Ledezma (born 1990; Leonel Moreira), Costa Rican football player
 Álex Rodríguez (Panamanian footballer) (born 1990; Álex Rodríguez Ledezma), Panamanian footballer
 Guadalupe Ledezma Sanchez (born 1961; Lupe Sanchez), American football defensive back
 Francisco Sierra Ledezma (born 1987; Francisco Sierra (boxer)), Mexican boxer
 Luis "El Children" Ledezma, member of the Mexican band Café Tacuba
 Julio "Jimmy" Ledezma, member of the Argentinian band Arco Iris (band)
 Jorge and Angel Ledezma, members of the Mexican-American band Allá

See also
 Ledesma (disambiguation)
 Jacala de Ledezma, town and municipality of Hidalgo, Mexico

Spanish-language surnames